The  (SDF), also referred to in Japanese by the shortened  , was a Japanese political party that existed from 1978 to 1994.

History 
The Socialist Democratic Federation was a splinter party of the Japan Socialist Party (JSP). Its emergence followed a series of upheavals involving this left-wing, opposition political party, which began with the establishment of the Democratic Socialist Party in January 1960 and the later reemergence of the Japan Communist Party (JCP). The exodus of its membership is partly attributed to the perceived pro-Communist tendencies on the part of the JSP leadership during the political crisis involving the revision of Japan's Mutual Security Treaty with the United States. Experts also blame a diminished public support for the socialist party, particularly in big cities. The process continued until the next decade when the Shaminren finally split off from JSP. By this time, JSP was already in severe disarray it was ridiculed as Ni-hon (two-volumed) Shokaito (socialist party).

The Socialist Democratic Federation became part of the non-liberal coalition that elected Morihiro Hosokawa as Japan's Prime Minister in 1993. During this election, the Shaminren obtained 0.7 percent share of the vote, securing four seats in the Japanese House of Representatives.

Socialist Citizen Federation (SCF) 
In 1977, Hideo Den, Yutaka Hara and Yanosuke Narazaki defected from the SDP and formed the Shakai Club party.

In 1993, Satsuki Eda was head of the Science and Technology Agency in Morihiro Hosokawa's cabinet.

List of presidents of the Socialist Democratic Federation (SDF)
 Hideo Den (March 1978 – February 1985)
 Satsuki Eda (February 1985 – May 1994)

See also 
 Democratic Party of Japan
 Japan New Party
 Naoto Kan
 New Party Sakigake
 New Frontier Party

References

1978 establishments in Japan
1994 disestablishments in Japan
Centrist parties in Japan
Liberal parties in Japan
Defunct political parties in Japan
Liberal socialism
Pacifism in Japan
Political parties disestablished in 1994
Political parties established in 1978
Social democratic parties in Japan